The 2010 European Track Championships were the inaugural elite European Track Championships in track cycling and took place at the BGŻ Arena in Pruszków, Poland, between 5 and 7 November.

All ten Olympic events (sprint, team sprint, keirin, team pursuit and omnium all for both men and women) and a men's madison championship were held as part of the championships. The Championships were the first European event for qualification for the 2012 Olympic Games.

Events

 Shaded events are non-Olympic events.

Medal table

Participating nations
25 nations participated.

, see: Netherlands at the 2010 European Track Championships

External links

European Cycling Union
Results book

European Track Championships, 2010
Cycling
Cycling
BGŻ Arena
 
European Track Championships